4942 Munroe, provisional designation , is an asteroid from the inner regions of the asteroid belt, approximately 3 kilometers in diameter. It was discovered on 24 February 1987, by Belgian astronomer Henri Debehogne at ESO's La Silla Observatory in northern Chile, and later named after American cartoonist and former NASA roboticist Randall Munroe.

Orbit and classification 

Munroe orbits the Sun in the inner main-belt at a distance of 1.9–2.5 AU once every 3 years and 3 months (1,193 days). Its orbit has an eccentricity of 0.14 and an inclination of 4° with respect to the ecliptic.

Physical characteristics 

In the SMASS taxonomy, Munroe is characterized as an X-type asteroid. It has an absolute magnitude of 13.5.

Diameter and albedo 

According to the survey carried out by the NEOWISE mission of NASA's Wide-field Infrared Survey Explorer, Munroe measures 3.453 kilometers in diameter and its surface has an exceptionally high albedo of 0.936. On his private blog, Randall Munroe (after whom the asteroid is named) calculates that the asteroid is between 6 and 10 kilometers in diameter, comparable in size to the Chicxulub asteroid.

Lightcurves 

As of 2017, Munroes rotation period, poles and shape remain unknown.

Naming 

In 2013, it was named after Randall Munroe (born 1984), a former NASA roboticist and the author of the webcomic xkcd. The name was chosen by xkcd readers Lewis Hulbert and Jordan Zhu. The official naming citation was published on 22 July 2013.

References

External links 
 Asteroid Lightcurve Database (LCDB), query form (info )
 Dictionary of Minor Planet Names, Google books
 Asteroids and comets rotation curves, CdR – Observatoire de Genève, Raoul Behrend
 Discovery Circumstances: Numbered Minor Planets (1)-(5000) – Minor Planet Center
 
 

004942
Discoveries by Henri Debehogne
Named minor planets
004942
19870224